Charles William Bartlett (1 June 186016 April 1940) was an English painter and printmaker who settled in Hawaii.

Biography
Bartlett studied metallurgy and worked in that field for several years.  At age 23, he enrolled in the Royal Academy in London, where he studied painting and etching. After three years of study in London, he entered the private studio school Académie Julian in Paris, where he studied under Jules Joseph Lefebvre (1836–1911) and Gustave Boulanger (1824–1888).

In 1889, he returned to England and married Emily Tate, but shortly thereafter, his wife and infant son died in childbirth.  Bartlett then traveled to Europe, spending several productive years in the Netherlands, Brittany and Venice with his friend and fellow artist Frank Brangwyn (1867–1956).  Brangwyn is believed to have introduced Bartlett to Japanese prints. Bartlett produced some of his most important early works on the Continent, especially studies of peasants painted in broad areas of colour.  He was invited to join the Société Nationale des Beaux-Arts in France in 1897. In 1898, he returned to England and married Catherine "Kate" Main.  Bartlett returned to the Continent with his second wife, and in 1908, he helped found the Société de la Peinture a l'Eau in Paris.  Several Continental museums acquired his paintings at the Paris exhibitions of the Société de la Peinture a l'Eau.

Bartlett made several trips to Brittany and the Netherlands with the Dutch painter Nico Wilhelm Jungmann (1872–1935), which provided the former with material for future paintings of peasants, whose dignity derived from the simple placement of shapes.

In 1913, with financial backing from his wife's well-to-do family, the Bartletts traveled to India, Ceylon, Indonesia, China, and Japan.  He arrived in Japan in 1915, where he met woodblock print publisher Watanabe Shōzaburō (1885–1962), who was a major force in early 20th-century Japanese art (shin-hanga).  In 1916 Watanabe published 21 woodblocks from Bartlett's designs, including six prints of Japanese landscapes.  In 1917, Bartlett and his second wife left Japan for England; however, they stopped off in Hawaii, where they remained—never returning to England.  He did visit Japan in 1919, where he created sixteen shin-hanga prints for Watanabe.

Anna Rice Cooke (1853–1934), who founded the Honolulu Museum of Art, became Bartlett's advocate and patron. In 1928, Bartlett helped to found the Honolulu Printmakers along with local artists Alexander Samuel MacLeod, John Melville Kelly, and Huc-Mazelet Luquiens. Charles Bartlett died in Hawaii at the age of 79 on 16 April 1940.

Collections and exhibitions
The Bradford Museums and Galleries (West Yorkshire, UK), the Bristol City Museum and Art Gallery (Bristol, England), the Cleveland Museum of Art, the Honolulu Museum of Art, the Library of Congress (Washington, D. C.), and the Jordan Schnitzer Museum of Art (University of Oregon) are among the public collections holding work by Charles W. Bartlett.

The Honolulu Museum of Art holds a large collection of Charles Bartlett's paintings and prints, and has held eight solo exhibitions of his work:
 Charles W. Bartlett: Watercolors, Oils and Prints, 30 May 1939 – 11 June 1939
 Retrospective Exhibition of Paintings and Sketches by Charles W. Bartlett (1860–1940), 5 February 1946 – 3 March 1946
 A Printmaker in Paradise: The Art and Life of Charles W. Bartlett, 15 November 2001 – 6 January 2002
 Charles Bartlett's Visions of India, 30 April 2009 – 31 January 2010
 Bartlett in Hawaii, 7 May 2009 – 13 September 2009
 Bartlett in China, 16 July 2009 – 1 November 2009
 Bartlett in Europe, 17 September 2009 – 17 January 2010
 Bartlett in Java and Ceylon, 28 January 2010 – 6 June 2010

Notes

References
 Bartlett, Charles W., Catalogue of an Exhibition of Water Colors and Wood Engravings of India, Japan, and the Hawaiian Islands by Charles W. Bartlett, New York, Arthur H. Hahlo & Co., 1919.
 Congdon-Martin, Douglas, Aloha Spirit, Hawaiian Art and Popular Design, Atglen, PA, Schiffer Publishing, 1998, pp. 176–177.
 Ellis, George R. and Marcia Morse, A Hawaii Treasury, Masterpieces from the Honolulu Academy of Arts, Tokyo, The Asahi Shimbun, 2000, 152–2, 224.
 Forbes, David W., Encounters with Paradise: Views of Hawaii and its People, 1778–1941, Honolulu Academy of Arts, 1992, pp. 206–233.
 Honolulu Academy of Arts, Charles W. Bartlett: Watercolors, Oils and Prints at the Honolulu Academy of Arts Exhibition May 30 – June 11, Honolulu Academy of Arts, 1939.
 Konody, P. G., "The Artist: Charles William Bartlett", The Studio (London), 1906.
 Merritt, Helen and Nanako Yamada, Guide to Modern Japanese Woodblock Prints, 1900–1975, Honolulu, University of Hawaii Press, 1995, .
 Miles, Richard and Jennifer Saville, A Printmaker in Paradise, The Art and Life of Charles W. Bartlett, with a catalogue raisonné of etchings and color woodblock prints, Honolulu Academy of Arts, 2001.
 Morse, Marcia (ed.), Honolulu Printmakers, Honolulu Academy of Arts, 2003, p. 14, .
 Numata, Hideko, "Charles W. Bartlett and Modern Japanese Landscape Woodblock Prints", In Eyes Towards Asia: Ukiyoe Artists from Abroad, Yokohama Museum of Art, 1996, pp. 227–238.
 Schmidt, Rosalind Bartlett, Charles W. Bartlett: The Early Period unpublished manuscript on deposit at the Library of Congress and at the Honolulu Academy of Arts, 1961.
 Stephens, Amy Reigle The New Wave – Twentieth Century Japanese Prints from the Robert O. Muller Collection, Bamboo Publishing Ltd. London and Hotei - Japanese Prints, Leiden, 2005.

External links

Académie Julian alumni
English printmakers
19th-century English painters
English male painters
20th-century English painters
Shin hanga artists
British Impressionist painters
People from Bridport
1860 births
1940 deaths
 Printmakers
20th-century American printmakers
20th-century British printmakers
19th-century English male artists
20th-century English male artists